The Nebraska Republican Party (NEGOP) is the affiliate of the Republican Party in Nebraska. The party is led by chair Dan Welch. Its headquarters is located in Lincoln. It is currently the dominant party in the state, controlling all of Nebraska's three U.S. House seats, both U.S. Senate seats, the state legislature, and the governorship.

Party history
After 1860, Republicans dominated state elections in Nebraska for 30 years. The state has been strongly Republican during presidential elections.

As a result of a referendum in 1934, Nebraska has the United States' only unicameral legislature, known as the Nebraska Unicameral. All representatives are officially nonpartisan. Despite this, Republicans have held a majority in the state legislature for several decades.

Political campaigns
In December 2009, the party organized a nationwide effort to unseat Democratic Senator Ben Nelson in 2012 under the theme "Give Ben The Boot".

Current elected officials
The Nebraska Republican Party currently controls all six statewide offices, both of the state's U.S. Senate seats, and two of the state's U.S. House seats.

Members of Congress

U.S. Senate

U.S. House of Representatives
Mike Flood, 1st District
Don Bacon, 2nd District
Adrian Smith, 3rd District

Statewide offices
Governor: Jim Pillen
Lieutenant Governor: Joe Kelly
Secretary of State: Bob Evnen
Attorney General: Mike Hilgers
Treasurer: John Murante
Auditor: Mike Foley

Statewide Supreme Court Justices
Michael Heavican, Chief Justice
Stephanie F. Stacy, District 1
William B. Cassel, District 3
Jonathan Papik, District 4
Jeffrey J. Funke, District 5
John Freudenberg, District 6

Party officers
Leadership: 
Eric Underwood, Chairman
Todd Watson, Assistant Chairman 
Jon Tucker, Assistant Chairman 
Cammie Methany, Assistant Chairman 
Deb Portz, Secretary
Dave Plond, Treasurer
JL Spray, National Committeeman
Fanchon Blythe, National Committeewoman
Bob Evnen, Legal Counsel

References

External links
Nebraska Republican Party

Republican Party
Nebraska